Page Lake (also known as Page's Pond, Corse's Pond and Lake Page) is a lake located in New Milford Township, Susquehanna County, Pennsylvania, United States. It is approximately 1.6 km long with an average center depth of 7.62 m.

Page Lake was created by settler Leonard Corse, who built dams in 1820 and 1830. The dam was again rebuilt after a collapse and flood in 1855.  The dam feeds into Salt Lick Creek, a tributary of the Susquehanna River.

Page Lake has been privately owned by the Lakeside Outing Club Inc. since 1922, and is operated as a "residential and vacation community."

On February 15, 2023 several Unidentified Flying Objects were reported by local CBS affiliate WYOU-TV. Captured on cell phone, four small white cylindrical shaped UFOs were seen moving in uniform formation rate of speed. Approximately 30 minutes after the UFOs disappeared several helicopters appeared flying low around the lake. Despite rumors, no abductions are known to have been reported."

See also
List of lakes in Pennsylvania

References

External links 

Lakes of Pennsylvania
Bodies of water of Susquehanna County, Pennsylvania
Resorts in Pennsylvania